The Greek Ambassador to Italy is the Ambassador of the Greek government to the government of Italy.
For Greece, Italy is the first commercial partner and Greece receives major Italian investments. 

Greek–Italian relations

References

Italy
 
Greece